Marwah may refer to:

 Al-Safa and Al-Marwah, hills in Saudi Arabia
 Marwah, a subdivision of Kishtwar district, Jammu and Kashmir, India
 Moriah, the mount where Abraham went to sacrifice his son
 Ved Marwah (born 1932), Indian politician

See also 
 Marwa (disambiguation)